Xavier Coller i Porta is a sociologist and journalist. He was born in Valencia, Spain.

He got his Ph.D from Yale University and Universitat Autònoma de Barcelona. In 2003 he received the Seymour Martin Lipset award from Princeton University, and in 2004 he was awarded Yale's Sussman Dissertation Prize. He taught at Yale, Georgetown, Europea de Madrid, UAB, UPF, UB, Alacant and ESADE.

He's author of about thirty publications. Among his recent books, Cànon sociològic (2003) and Anàlisi d'organitzacions (2004).

External links
Bibliografia de Xavier Coller (Dialnet)

Spanish sociologists
Spanish journalists
Academic staff of ESADE
Yale University alumni
Living people
Year of birth missing (living people)